Grand Prix motorcycle racing is the premier championship of motorcycle road racing, which has been divided into three classes: MotoGP, Moto2, and Moto3. Classes that have been discontinued include 500cc (although 500cc statistics are combined with MotoGP officially), 350cc, 250cc, 125cc, 80cc, 50cc and Sidecar.  The Grand Prix Road-Racing World Championship was established in 1949 by the sport's governing body, the Fédération Internationale de Motocyclisme (FIM), and is the oldest motorsport World Championship.

There were five classes when the championship started in 1949; 500cc, 350cc, 250cc, 125cc and sidecar (600cc). The 50cc class was introduced in 1962. Due to escalating costs that resulted in a number of manufacturers leaving the championship, the FIM limited the 50cc bikes to a single cylinder, the 125cc and 250cc bikes were limited to two cylinders and the 350cc and 500cc bikes were limited to four cylinders. The 350cc class was discontinued in 1982, two years later the 50cc class was replaced with an 80cc class, which was discontinued in 1989. The sidecar class left the series to form its own championship after 1996. In 2002, 990cc four stroke engined bikes replaced the 500cc bikes and the class was renamed as MotoGP. 600cc four-stroke bikes replaced the 250cc bikes in 2010, with the class rebranded as Moto2. Since 2012, the Moto3 class (250cc four-stroke one cylinder) replaced the 125cc class.

The 750cc was never part of the Grand Prix motorcycle racing series.

The Constructors' World Championship is awarded to the most successful constructor over a season, as determined by a points system based on Grand Prix results. Only the highest-scoring rider in each race for each constructor contributing points towards the Championship. The winner of the constructors' world championship is not necessarily the bike used by the riders' world champion. For example, in 2004, Valentino Rossi who rode a Yamaha bike won the riders' world championship, but in the constructors' standings, Honda have higher points than Yamaha, therefore Honda won constructors' world championship.

For the sidecar class, the constructors championship went to the engine manufacturer, not the chassis manufacturer.  For the Moto2 class, the championship goes to the chassis manufacturer, not the engine manufacturer, since all competitors are required to use spec engines provided by Triumph (Honda from 2010 until 2018).

By year

1954 Constructors' titles were not recognized by the Federation following a political crisis with the constructors (represented by the International Permanent Bureau of Motorcycle Manufacturers) concerning the number of races to be held during the season and the abolition of the riders' championship.

By constructor
Constructors in bold are participating in any of the classes (except MotoE) of the 2022 World Championship. Unrecognized titles are not counted.
{| class="wikitable sortable" 
! Constructor
! 
! Moto2
! Moto3
! 350cc
! 250cc
! 125cc
! 80cc
! 50cc
! 
! Total
|-style="border-top:3px solid #aaaaaa"
|  Honda
|align="center"|25
|
|align="center"|5
|align="center"| 6
|align="center"|19
|align="center"|15
|
|align="center"| 2
|
! 72
|-style="border-top:3px solid #aaaaaa"
|  Yamaha
|align="center"| 14
|
|
|align="center"| 5
|align="center"| 14
|align="center"| 4
|
|
|align="center"| 11
! 48
|-style="border-top:3px solid #aaaaaa"
|  MV Agusta
|align="center"| 16
|
|
|align="center"| 9
|align="center"| 5
|align="center"| 7
|
|
|
! 37
|-style="border-top:3px solid #aaaaaa"
|  Aprilia
|
|
|
|
|align="center"| 9
|align="center"| 10
|
|
|
! 19
|-
|  BMW
|
|
|
|
|
|
|
|
|align="center"|19
! 19
|-style="border-top:3px solid #aaaaaa"
|  Suzuki
|align="center"| 7
|
|
|
|
|align="center"| 3
|
|align="center"| 5
|
! 15
|-style="border-top:3px solid #aaaaaa"
|  Kalex
|
|align="center"| 10
|
|
|
|
|
|
|
! 10
|-style="border-top:3px solid #aaaaaa"
|  Norton
|align="center"| 2
|
|
|align="center"| 2
|
|
|
|
|align="center"| 5
! 9
|-
|  Kawasaki
|
|
|
|align="center"| 4
|align="center"| 4
|align="center"| 1
|
|
|
! 9
|-
|  Derbi
|
|
|
|
|
|align="center"| 4
|align="center"| 3
|align="center"| 2
|
! 9
|-
|  Krauser
|
|
|
|
|
|
|align="center"| 2
|
|align="center"| 7
! 9
|-style="border-top:3px solid #aaaaaa"
|  KTM
|
|
|align="center"| 5
|
|
|align="center"| 1
|
|
|
! 6
|-
|  Moto Guzzi
|
|
|
|align="center"| 3
|align="center"| 3
|
|
|
|
! 6
|-style="border-top:3px solid #aaaaaa"
|  Gilera
|align="center"| 4
|
|
|align="center"| 1
|
|
|
|
|
! 5
|-
|  Mondial
|
|
|
|
|align="center"| 1
|align="center"| 4
|
|
|
! 5
|-
|  Garelli
|
|
|
|
|
|align="center"| 4
|
|align="center"| 1
|
! 5
|-
|  Kreidler
|
|
|
|
|
|
|
|align="center"|  5
|
! 5
|-style="border-top:3px solid #aaaaaa"
|  Ducati
|align="center"| 4
|
|
|
|
|
|
|
|
! 4
|-
|  Minarelli
|
|
|
|
|
|align="center"| 4
|
|
|
! 4
|-style="border-top:3px solid #aaaaaa"
|  Suter
|
|align="center"| 3
|
|
|
|
|
|
|
! 3
|-
|  Morbidelli
|
|
|
|
|
|align="center"| 3
|
|
|
! 3
|-
|  Bultaco
|
|
|
|
|
|
|
|align="center"| 3
|
! 3
|-
|  König
|
|
|
|
|
|
|
|
|align="center"| 3 
! 3
|-
|  LCR-ADM
|
|
|
|
|
|
|
|
|align="center"| 3 
! 3
|-style="border-top:3px solid #aaaaaa"
|  Velocette
|
|
|
|align="center"| 2
|
|
|
|
|
! 2
|-
|  Benelli
|
|
|
|
|align="center"| 2
|
|
|
|
! 2
|-
|  MBA
|
|
|
|
|
|align="center"| 2
|
|
|
! 2
|-style="border-top:3px solid #aaaaaa"
|  AJS
|align="center"| 1
|
|
|
|
|
|
|
|
! 1
|-
|  Gas Gas
|
|
|align="center"| 1
|
|
|
|
|
|
! 1
|-
|  Bimota
|
|
|
|align="center"| 1
|
|
|
|
|
! 1
|-
|  NSU
|
|
|
|
|align="center"| 1
|
|
|
|
! 1
|-
|  Harley-Davidson
|
|
|
|
|align="center"| 1
|
|
|
|
! 1
|-
|  Zündapp
|
|
|
|
|
|
|align="center"| 1
|
|
! 1
|-
|  Motul Bultaco
|
|
|
|
|
|
|
|align="center"| 1
|
! 1
|-class="sortbottom"
! Total
! 73
! 13
! 11
! 33
! 59
! 62
! 6
! 19
! 48
! 324
|}

By country
Countries in bold''' have constructors of that nationality participating in any of the classes (except MotoE) of the 2022 World Championship.

References

External links
MotoGP Statistics

Grand Prix motorcycle racing
Motorcycle racing champions
Grand Prix motorcycle racing World Constructors' Champions